Dustin Dean Hite (born November 14, 1983), is an American politician from the state of Iowa.

Hite was born in Mahaska County, Iowa in 1983. He resides with his family in New Sharon, Iowa.

In late 2021, Hite announced his re-election bid for the newly re-drawn Iowa House Seat 88 (changed from the previous Iowa House Seat 79). He lost that primary election to Helena Hayes.

Electoral history
*incumbent

2018

2020

2022

References

1983 births
Living people
People from Mahaska County, Iowa
Republican Party members of the Iowa House of Representatives
21st-century American politicians